Ephemeridae is a family of mayflies with about 150 described species found throughout the world except Australia and Oceania. These are generally quite large mayflies (up to 35 mm) with either two or three very long tails. Many species have distinctively patterned wings.

Ephemerids breed in a wide range of waters, usually requiring a layer of silt as the nymphs have strong legs which are adapted for burrowing (the group is sometimes known as burrowing mayflies). The nymphs are largely carnivorous and collect their food either through predation or scavenging.

References

Chinery, Michael Collins Guide to the Insects of Britain and Western Europe 1986 (Reprinted 1991)
McGavin, George C. Insects and Spiders 2004
Fauna Europaea
Nomina Insecta Nearctica

Mayflies
Insect families